Narasaraopet is a city and district headquarters of Palnadu District of the Indian state of Andhra Pradesh. The town is a municipality and mandal headquarters of Narasaraopet mandal and Headquarters of Narasaraopet revenue division. The town also is the seat of the court of Additional District Judge. Narasaraopet acts as a melting point for the Palnadu and Delta regions of the district. The town is also referred as the 'Gateway of Palnadu'. The main offices of Nagarjuna Sagar Jawahar Canal (N.S. Right Canal) Operation & Maintenance Lingamguntla Circle are located in this town.

Etymology 
The original name of the village was Atluru. The name Narsaraopet comes from Rajah Malraju Narasa Rao, the local Zamindar, who  owned much of the surrounding areas.

Geography and climate 

Narasaraopeta is the major commercial trading centre in Palanadu district. Narasaraopeta is located on flat land ringed by hills that are an extension of the Eastern Ghats with red rock soil.
Rainfall is due to the monsoon and is concentrated in the months of July–September.
The southwest monsoon season contributes , while the northeast monsoon contributes . Pre-monsoon thundershowers contribute .

Demographics 

 census, Narasaraopet had a population of 116,329 with 28,186 households. The total population constitute, 58,898 males and 57,431 females —a sex ratio of 975 females per 1000 males. 10,445 children are in the age group of 0–6 years, of which 5,390 are boys and 5,055 are girls —a ratio of 938 per 1000. The average literacy rate stands at 79.45% with 84,123 literates, significantly higher than the state average of 67.41%.

The Urban Agglomeration had a population of 118,568, of which males constitute 60,514, females constitute 58,054 —a sex ratio of 975 females per 1000 males and 10,519 children are in the age group of 0–6 years. There are a total of 84,889 literates with an average literacy rate of 79.30%.

Economy 
It serves as a major commercial centre to the surrounding villages and nearby villages of the Prakasam District. The town is the regional centre for higher education and health services. As a result of proximity to several towns/cities like Chilakaluripeta(), Guntur(), Piduguralla(), Sattenapalle(), Vinukonda(), on an average around 50,000 floating population is observed on a daily basis.

Governance 

Civic administration

Narasaraopet Municipality is a civic body of Narasaraopet, constituted on 18 May 1915.

Politics

Narasaraopet is a part of Narasaraopet assembly constituency for Andhra Pradesh Legislative Assembly. Gopireddy Srinivas Reddy is the present MLA of the constituency from YSR Congress Party. It is also a part of Narasaraopet lok sabha constituency which was won by LAVU KRISHNA DEVARAYULU of YSR Congress Party.

Transport 

The Guntur to Kurnool / Ananthapuram / Bellary  NH 544D bypasses the city and the NH167A road (Piduguralla to Chirala) passes through the city. APSRTC operates buses from Narasaraopet bus station.

Narasaraopet railway station is located on the Nallapadu–Nandyal section and administered under Guntur railway division of South Central Railway zone.

Tourism 
Kotappakonda hill is a major religious destination dedicated to Lord Shiva. On the auspicious day of Mahasivarathri, A grand fair is conducted nearby the hill. During which people around the surrounding regions visit the shiva temple on the kottappakonda hill.

Bheema lingeswara Swamy Temple and Pathuru Shivalayam(renovated) located in the city also receive limited tourism.

Education 
The primary and secondary school education is imparted by government, aided and private schools, under the School Education Department of the state. The medium of instruction followed by different schools are English and Telugu.

Narasaraopeta is surrounded by many engineering, PG, And pharmacy colleges. Some notable include
 Amara Institute of Engineering and Technology (Satuluru)
 Eswar College of engineering (Kesanupalli)
 Narasaraopeta Engineering College (Kotappakonda road)
 Narasaraopeta Institute of Technology (Kotappakonda road)
 S.K.R.B.R Reddy College
 Sri Subbaraya and Narayana college (.est 1950)
 Sri Venkateswara Paladugu Nagaiah Chowdary & Krotha Raghu ramaiah College (.est 1991)
 Sai Tirumala Engineering College
 Tirumala Engineering College (Jonnalagadda)
 University College of Engineering, Narasaraopeta or JNTUN
krishna veni degree college( Ramireddypet)
krishna veni Engineering women's college(kesanupalli)
M.A.M Pharmacy college (Kesanupalli)
Siddartha Pharmacy college (Jonnalagadda)

See also 
 List of cities in India by population
 List of cities in Andhra Pradesh by population
 List of municipalities in Andhra Pradesh

References

External links 

Cities in Andhra Pradesh
Mandal headquarters in Guntur district